Michael Gibson (born 31 October 1965) is a former Australian rules footballer who played for Fitzroy and the Brisbane Bears in the Victorian/Australia Football League (VFL/AFL).

Gibson, a half back flanker, was a Coorparoo premiership player in 1984 and played at Fitzroy the following season. He then returned to Coorparoo in 1986 and participated in another premiership team. A member of Brisbane's inaugural VFL list, he spent five seasons with the club.
 
Amongst his 15 interstate matches for Queensland were appearances at the 1988 Adelaide Bicentennial Carnival. He had also been an All-Australian junior for his state.

The defender went on to become a QFL coach and had stints at both Coorparoo and Mount Gravatt.

References

Holmesby, Russell and Main, Jim (2007). The Encyclopedia of AFL Footballers. 7th ed. Melbourne: Bas Publishing.

1965 births
Living people
Brisbane Bears players
Fitzroy Football Club players
Coorparoo Football Club players
Mount Gravatt Football Club players
Australian rules footballers from Queensland